Abisara is a genus of butterflies in the family Riodinidae, found in Africa and Southeast Asia.

Most species in the genus have the common name Judy.

Species
Abisara abnormis
Abisara aita
Abisara bifasciata
Abisara burnii
Abisara caeca
Abisara cameroonensis
Abisara chela
Abisara chelina
Abisara delicata
Abisara dewitzi
Abisara echerius
Abisara freda
Abisara fylla
Abisara fylloides
Abisara gerontes
Abisara geza
Abisara intermedia
Abisara kausambi
Abisara miyazakii
Abisara neavei
Abisara neophron
Abisara rogersi
Abisara rutherfordii
Abisara saturata
Abisara savitri
Abisara sobrina
Abisara talantus
Abisara tantalus

References

 Seitz, A. Die Gross-Schmetterlinge der Erde 13: Die Afrikanischen Tagfalter. Plate XIII 61

 
Nemeobiinae
Butterfly genera
Taxa named by Baron Cajetan von Felder
Taxa named by Rudolf Felder